Samar Mukherjee (7 November 1913 – 18 July 2013) was an Indian Communist leader. who served as member of the Lok Sabha, the lower house of the Parliament of India for the Howrah constituency for three consecutive term, and as a member of the Rajya Sabha. He was a member of the Polit Bureau, member of the Central Committee of Communist Party of India (Marxist) and he was also the General Secretary CITU.

Early life
Mukherjee was born to Sachindralal Mukherjee and Golapsundari Devi in a village near Amta in Howrah district on 7 November 1913. On 3 February 1928, the Indian Statutory Commission, headed by Sir John Simon arrived at Bombay, and was greeted by nationwide protests with black flags, and nationwide hartal was observed. Samar, who was then only a Class VII-student, became a part of the students and teachers, who had convened a joint hartal in the school. In March 1930, he joined the Civil Disobedience Movement at the call of Mahatma Gandhi, and conducted picketing in front of the wine shops, and against wearing foreign clothes. On 7 July 1930 he joined and conducted a three-and-half months' long students strike in Pitambar High School, as part of the school-college boycott call given by the Indian National Congress. After the successful strike, he was rusticated from the school for participating in the strike. In the same year, he was imprisoned under a false libel suit filed by police under Section 107, Indian Penal Code. After being imprisoned for 6 months, he was set free. In March, 1931 the case was withdrawn following the Gandhi–Irwin Pact.

Introduction to politics
In 1932, Mukherjee got admitted to the Bowbazaar High School in the 10th Standard, and passed the Matriculation next year. In 1932, he was made the Secretary of the Amta Congress Committee, and later of the Uluberia Provincial Congress Committee. He was subsequently inducted into the Howrah District Committee of the Indian National Congress. In 1936, Mukherjee met Bimal Roy, a Communist leader from Rangpur District, who was then under house arrest in Amta. In 1938, Samar became the President of Howrah District Committee of the AISF. In 1939, he also attended a Conference of the All India Kisan Sabha at Panchla in Howrah as a delegate. In 1940, he earned the membership of the Communist Party of India, and left his home to become a whole timer. He was again arrested for organizing peasant movement in Howrah district. He carried a book of historical and dialectical materialism at the time of arrest. He became the Convenor of the Communist Consolidation of the Dum Dum Jail. He was released after 3 months, and then relocated to Amta with the pseudonym "Mani". In 1942, he became the first Secretary of the Howrah District Committee of the CPI. In 1943, he was a delegate in the 1st Party Congress of CPI in Bombay. In 1946, he took an active part in anti-riot campaigning, and was attacked by both Hindu and Muslim rioters. In 1948, the Indian National Congress government declared CPI as illegal, and Samar was yet again arrested. Upon release, he concentrated organizing movement in Howrah district. He even had to jump off a running train at Santragachi railway station to evade arrest. In 1953, he was inducted as a member of the West Bengal State Council (Rajya Parishad) of the CPI. He also associated himself with the United Central Refugee Council (UCRC). In 1956, he took an active part in increasing the circulation of Swadhinata, the then party mouthpiece in the state.

Introduction to Communist
He turned himself as a leader of the refugee movement under the banner of the United Central Refugee Council (UCRC), and gets himself arrested. He was made a candidate in the Assembly Elections, 1957 from the Howrah North, and defeated the sitting Speaker of the Assembly, Shaila Mukherjee. In 1959, he was elected as the Secretary of the UCRC, and took a valiant role in refugee rehabilitation in the country. In 1961 Bardhaman conference, he was elected as a State Secretariat member of the CPI. During the Sino-Indian War of 1962, arrest warrants were issued against Communist leaders. He evaded arrest by scaling the back walls of his house in Amta. At that time, he was made the Secretary of the Underground State Committee of the Marxist–Leninist fraction of the Party. He took a pseudonym "Prithwiraj", and organized movement for the release of political prisoners. As the mouthpiece "Swadhinata" was captured by the revisionist section of the party, he changed the Marxist periodical "Howrah Hitoishee" into "Deshhitoishee". "Deshhitoishee" was first published on 16 August 1963. On 22 April 1964 he was instrumental in founding an Institute of Marxism–Leninism was established. Just before the 7th Party Congress in 1964, he was arrested again. Months earlier, leaders such as Muzaffar Ahmed, Hare Krishna Konar and Promode Dasgupta were arrested. They were released in May 1966. He was made a member of the Central Committee of the newly formed Communist Party of India (Marxist). He used the pseudonym "Ashok Mukherjee" to write exhaustively in "Deshhitoishee" against the revisionist trends in Indian Communist parties. With the formation of the CITU in 1970, he became a member of its Working Committee. He represented the CPI(M) in the 5th Party Congress of Workers' Party of Korea in November 1970. In 1971, he was elected a member of the 5th Lok Sabha from Howrah. In 1974, he was one of the mainstays of the Railway workers during the historical Railway Strike and gave a historical speech in support of the striking workers. In 1977, he was re-elected to the 6th Lok Sabha from Howrah. He joined the International Peace Conference at Paris in 1977, as a part of the Parliamentary delegation. He served as the leader of the CPI(M) group in Lok Sabha between 1977 and 1984. In 1978, he was elected to the Polit Bureau of the CPI(M), and remained in that capacity till he was elected as the Chairman of the Party's Central Control Commission at the 14th Congress of the Party in January 1992 at erstwhile Madras. Samar Mukherjee and M. Basavapunniah represented the CPI(M) in the 6th Congress of the Workers' Party of Korea in October 1980. In 1982, he represented the CITU in the 10th Congress of the World Federation of Trade Unions at Havana. In 1983, Mukherjee became the General Secretary of the CITU from Kanpur conference, and remained in that post up to 1991. In 1985, he visited Afghanistan as part of the CPI(M) delegation invited by the People's Democratic Party of Afghanistan, and held discussion with revolutionary leader Babrak Karmal. In 1986, he was elected to the Rajya Sabha, and played pivotal part in the proper representation of demands of workers, peasants and employees. In 1987, he was re-elected to the Rajya Sabha, and was a member until 1993.

Death 

He died on 18 July 2013 at Kolkata, after being admitted to the hospital the day before.

References 

Madhyamam.com

1913 births
2013 deaths
India MPs 1971–1977
India MPs 1977–1979
India MPs 1980–1984
Rajya Sabha members from West Bengal
Communist Party of India (Marxist) politicians from West Bengal
People from Howrah district
Indian independence activists from Bengal
Prisoners and detainees of British India
Lok Sabha members from West Bengal